Northwind is the fifth album by Swedish power metal band Falconer, the first to feature returning vocalist Mathias Blad since Chapters from a Vale Forlorn.

Track listing

"Child of the Wild" was originally included on "Grime vs. Grandeur", but was re-recorded as a bonus track with Mathias Blad on lead vocals.

Digipack bonus CD
"Kristallen den Fina"
"Ridom, Ridom"
"Liten Vätte"
"Vårvindar Friska"

Also features a video documentary of the recording

Credits
 Mathias Blad - vocals
 Stefan Weinerhall - Rhythm and Lead Guitars, keyboards, Mandolin
 Jimmy Hedlund - Lead Guitars
 Magnus Linhardt - Bass
 Karsten Larsson - drums

Guest musician
Johannes Nyberg - Piano & Harpsichord

2006 albums
Falconer (band) albums
Metal Blade Records albums